Wurzbach Parkway is a part freeway and part major arterial road in San Antonio, Texas, built to provide relief on Interstate 410 (I-410) and Loop 1604 on the city's north side. The highway is named for Harry M. Wurzbach, who represented the San Antonio area in Congress as a Republican in the 1920s and 1930s. The congressman's name was first applied to the connecting Wurzbach Road. The highway's western third was built as an expressway with at-grade intersections and the remainder as a freeway. The opening in September 2015 of an interchange with U.S. Highway 281 (US 281) completed primary construction of the parkway. The highway, along with part of Wurzbach Road near the Ingram Park Mall, is maintained by the Texas Department of Transportation despite not carrying a state highway designation. Rather, it is being developed and maintained under the Principal Arterial State System (PASS) program, under which it is designated as PASS Project 1502. The parkway includes an interchange with US 281, and drivers can access I-10 and I-35 via local roads that extend the parkway.

Route description
The west portion of the parkway is a limited-access surface road that connects Lockhill–Selma Road to West Avenue, crossing Blanco Road (FM 2696) with an interchange, and Military Highway (Farm to Market Road 1535, FM 1535) at-grade. Wurzbach Road continues southwest from Lockhill-Selma Road, crossing I-10 at exit 561. The area between West Avenue and Wetmore Road includes an interchange with US 281. From Wetmore Road, on the northeast side of the San Antonio International Airport, the parkway continues east beyond Thousand Oaks Drive. At the east end are several at-grade intersections before the parkway ends at O'Connor Road and Crosswinds Way; O'Connor Road leads southeast to I-35 at exit 169.

History
Planners conceived the parkway in the mid-1980s as the East–West Parkway, an extension of the existing Wurzbach Road, to relieve traffic on I-410. The road, estimated to cost $90 million, was approved by the Texas Transportation Commission in 1988, to be built by the state but funded in part by the City of San Antonio. Construction began in mid-1994 on the section between Wetmore Road and Nacogdoches Road and opened in July 1996. and the eastern portion of the roadway opened on August 26, 1999, allowing traffic to bypass I-410. The west section was opened on July 24, 2002, its fourth section opened on December 23, 2013. In September 2015, the central stretch of the parkway opened to traffic, effectively completing the project after 21 years.

The Alamo Regional Mobility Authority (RMA) conducted a supplemental environmental assessment on the entire corridor from Lockhill–Selma Road to I-35, emphasizing the segment that had not been constructed. The EA supplemented the EA completed several years prior to initial construction. The Alamo RMA considered three alternatives for the interchange with US 281. The first alternative was a Wurzbach Parkway bridge over US 281 with no direct connection between the two highways, but with access via the highway's two frontage roads (this option was chosen). The second option would have included an elevated roundabout interchange to provide direct access between the highways. The final alternative would have involved main lane to main lane connector ramps from Wurzbach Parkway to US 281 and loop ramps for access from US 281 to Wurzbach Parkway.

According to the San Antonio Express-News, the Texas Transportation Commission reviewed the parkway expansion on November 19, 2009. The project was funded by proceeds from Proposition 12 bonds approved by voters in 2007, a package which was voted on by commissioners. Clay Smith, TxDOT's San Antonio District planning engineer, said the Wurzbach Parkway project would get $126 million under the bond-financing plan, enough for TxDOT to finish the three final segments left on the parkway. The expansion construction was completed in two phases: the first from Blanco Road to West Avenue and from Jones Maltsberger Road to Wetmore; the second between West Avenue and Jones Maltsberger.

The parkway has no ramps that connect directly to I-35 to the east (only allowing drivers to use O'Connor Road that leads to the parkway) and no plans for Wurzbach Parkway to extend to I-10 to the west (only allowing drivers to use the Wurzbach Road exit to connect to the parkway).

Future
TxDOT has also proposed improvements to the parkway's intersections at NW Military Highway and Lockhill-Selma Road.

Major junctions

References

External links

Transportation in Bexar County, Texas
Freeways in Texas
Parkways in the United States